Timothy or Tim Corcoran may refer to:

Timothy Corcoran (cultural historian) (1871–1943), Irish Jesuit scholar
Tim Corcoran (first baseman) (born 1953), American baseball first baseman/outfielder
Timothy R. Corcoran, American legislator in the Vermont House of Representatives
Timothy  Corcoran II, his son, also a member of the Vermont House of Representatives
Tim Corcoran (pitcher) (born 1978), American baseball pitcher

See also
Corcoran (surname)